I Met a Girl may refer to:

"I Met a Girl", song by Dean Martin  From the Broadway Show "Bells Are Ringing" (1956)
"I Met a Girl", sung by The Shadows, written by Hank Marvin
"I Met a Girl" (William Michael Morgan song)
I Met a Girl (film), a 2020 Australian romantic drama film